Rocco D'Assunta (7 February 1904 – 27 January 1970) was an Italian actor, comedian and playwright.

Life and career 
Born in Palermo, D'Assunta started acting at very young age with several Sicilian stage companies, including the ones led by Angelo Musco and Giovanni Grasso. At the beginning of the thirties he moved to Rome where he was part of the "Za-Bum Company" directed by Mario Mattoli, then he devoted himself to  radio as a member of the "Teatro Comico Musicale" on Radio Roma that got him some popularity thanks to his comic monologues caricaturing typical Sicilian characters. He made his cinema debut in 1933, and was mainly cast in character roles of Sicilian people. He was also active on television.

D'Assunta was also the author, under the pseudonym Roda, of the stage play Io, Angelo Musco, which was first represented in 1962. His daughter Solvejg D'Assunta is also an actress and a voice actress.

Partial filmography 

Nini Falpala (1933)
 Bad Subject (1933)
 La segretaria per tutti (1933)
 Creatures of the Night (1934)
 Red Passport (1935) - Un soldato in trincea
 Golden Arrow (1935)
 King of Diamonds (1936) - Don Cola - il sensale
 Doctor Antonio (1937) - Michele Pironti
 Abandon All Hope (1937)
 The Ferocious Saladin (1937)
 L'antenato (1938)
 Il suo destino (1938) - Il sordo
 L'aria del continente (1939)
 Think It Over Jack (1940) - Customer
 Sempre più difficile (1943) - Cardella
 Christmas at Camp 119 (1947) - Lojacono, il siciliano
 Outlaw Girl (1950) - Don Agatino Santoro
 The Outlaws (1950) - Rocco Creo, the sacristan
 The Knight Has Arrived! (1950) - Capo dei Banditi
 O.K. Nerone (1951) - Pannunzia, the Prefect
 Una bruna indiavolata! (1951) - Il ladro
 Anna (1951) - Un padre
 Cops and Robbers (1951)  - Client in Tavern (uncredited)
 Toto in Color (1952) - Il cognato siciliano
 Man, Beast and Virtue (1953) - Zeppo
 Canto per te (1953)
 An American in Rome (1954) - Commissario
 Totò lascia o raddoppia? (1956) - Joe Taccola
 The Wanderers (1956) - Un corteggiatore di Dolores
 Ci sposeremo a Capri (1956) - Onorato Raimondi
 Amaramente (1956) - Luigi Cerelli
 Roulotte e roulette (1959) - Facciponti
 Mafia alla sbarra (1963)
 Liolà (1964)
 Seduced and Abandoned (1964) - Orlando Califano
 I soldi (1965)

References

External links 
 

1904 births
1970 deaths
Italian male film actors
Italian male television actors
Italian male stage actors
Italian male radio actors
Male actors from Palermo
20th-century Italian male actors
Italian male comedians
20th-century Italian male writers
20th-century Italian dramatists and playwrights
20th-century Italian comedians